Couples is a 2011 South Korean romantic comedy film directed by Jeong Yong-ki.

Plot 
Yoo-suk is looking for his ex-girlfriend who left him with only a text. Ae-yeon has only the diamond ring her lover left when they broke up. Nari continues to wander searching for true love. Bok-Nam is in love with his friend's girlfriend. Byung-chan refuses to believe love exists. When these five hopeless people find their lives intertwining, they discover love and become couples in unexpected ways.

Cast 
Kim Joo-hyuk as Yoo-suk
Lee Yoon-ji as Ae-Yeon
Lee Si-young  as Nari
Oh Jung-se as Bok-nam
Gong Hyung-jin as Byung-chan
Won Woong-jae as Sang-doo

References

External links
 

South Korean romantic comedy films
2010s South Korean films